José Maria Schwartz da Costa (born 10 January 1941) is a Brazilian former volleyball player who competed in the 1964 Summer Olympics and in the 1968 Summer Olympics.

References

1941 births
Living people
Brazilian men's volleyball players
Olympic volleyball players of Brazil
Volleyball players at the 1964 Summer Olympics
Volleyball players at the 1968 Summer Olympics